Ana Díaz may refer to:
 Ana Díaz (Mexican singer) (born 1972), Mexican composer and singer
 Ana Diaz (Swedish singer) (born 1977), Swedish singer, composer and music producer
 Ana Díaz (volleyball) (born 1954), Cuban volleyball player
 Ana Mae Díaz (born c. 1966), First Lady of Panama
 Ana Díaz (footballer) (born 2002), American-raised Puerto Rican footballer 
 Ana Odaliza Díaz (born 1985), Dominican footballer
 Ana Díaz (Buenos Aires Premetro), a Buenos Aires Premetro station

Diaz, Ana